Bosnian Rainbows is the only studio album by American alternative rock band Bosnian Rainbows, released on June 24, 2013 on Clouds Hill, Sargent House and Rodriguez-Lopez Productions. Recorded and produced by Johann Scheerer, the album was recorded at Clouds Hill Studios in Hamburg, Germany in October 2012, during a break in band's touring schedule.

Bosnian Rainbows debuted at #2 on Billboard Top Heatseekers chart.

Production
Bosnian Rainbows was produced on analog gear, without the use of computers.

Critical reception
Reviews were mixed; Rolling Stone said the album was impressive as an "art rock abnegation" but said they were left wanting more "excess" after Lopez's restrained New Wave style riffs on tracks like Morning Sickness. 
NPR called every song on the album "catchy and anthemic" with a "cryptic" lyrical style compared to Tori Amos. Combining upbeat melodies with "hints of melancholy", Teri Gender Bender's vocals have been compared to David Bowie.

Release

The album's first single, "Torn Maps", was digitally released on January 25, 2013. The second single, "Turtle Neck" followed on February 11, 2013.

Track listing

Clouds Hill Special Edition also features Bosnian Rainbows Live at Clouds Hill 10" vinyl

Personnel
Bosnian Rainbows
Omar Rodríguez-López – guitar, keyboards, backing vocals
Teri Gender Bender – vocals
Deantoni Parks – drums, keyboards, samples
Nicci Kasper – keyboards, synths
Recording personnel
Johann Scheerer – producer, recording engineer
Matt Bittman – mixing and mastering engineer
Artwork
Sonny Kay – album art, layout

References

External links
"Bosnian Rainbows" on Rodriguez-Lopez Productions' official website

2013 debut albums
Omar Rodríguez-López albums